Yee Nunataks is a group of scattered nunataks, about 24 miles (38 km) long and 12 miles (19 km) wide, centered 35 miles (60 km) northeast of Lyon Nunataks in Palmer Land. The nunataks rise 1,300-1,700 m in elevation and in the four quadrants include Staack Nunatak, Olander Nunatak, Metzgar Nunatak and Triassic Nunatak. Mapped by United States Geological Survey (USGS) from surveys and U.S. Navy aerial photographs, 1961–68, and U.S. Landsat imagery, 1973–74. Named in 1994 by Advisory Committee on Antarctic Names (US-ACAN) after Virginia Yee-Wray, cartographer and air brush specialist in the Shaded Relief and Special Maps Unit, Branch of Special Maps, USGS, who for many years prepared USGS shaded relief maps of Antarctica.

See also
Crutcher Rock
Voight Nunatak

Nunataks of Palmer Land